The Saginaw Aquifer is a bedrock aquifer located in central Michigan in the United States. It is part of an aquifer system found in Mississippian or younger stratigraphic units in the Michigan Basin.

The aquifer contains both fresh water and salt water. In areas of the aquifer where fresh water is present, it is a primary source of municipal water, including in Clinton, Ingham and Eaton counties, encompassing the Lansing-East Lansing Metropolitan Area. Only about 0.03 percent of the aquifer is used for drinking, while the rest is for domestic and industrial use.

See also 
List of aquifers

References

Aquifers in the United States
Geology of Michigan
Water in Michigan